Minuscule 564 (in the Gregory-Aland numbering), ε 1026 (in the Soden numbering), is a Greek minuscule manuscript of the New Testament, on parchment. Palaeographically it has been assigned to the 10th century. 
Scrivener labelled it by number 478.
The manuscript has complex contents.

Description 
The codex contains a complete text of the four Gospels on 360 parchment leaves (size ). The writing is in one column per page, 21 lines per page. The initial letters are in gold.

There is also a division according to the Ammonian Sections (in Mark 236 – 16:12), with references to the Eusebian Canons.

Text 
The Greek text of the codex is a representative of the Byzantine text-type. Hermann von Soden classified it to the textual family Kx. Aland placed it in Category V.

According to the Claremont Profile Method it represents the textual family Kx in Luke 1, and Luke 20. In Luke 10 no profile was made.

The Pericope Adulterae (John 7:53–8:11) is placed at the end of John (after 21:25).

History 
The manuscript was brought by Constantin von Tischendorf from the East. It was added to the list of the New Testament manuscripts by F. H. A. Scrivener.

Currently the manuscript is housed at the Library of the Leipzig University Library (Cod. Gr. 6).

See also 

 List of New Testament minuscules
 Biblical manuscript
 Textual criticism

References

Further reading 

 C.v. Tischendorf, Anecdota Sacra et profana, pp. 20–29

Greek New Testament minuscules
10th-century biblical manuscripts